Gustav von Seyffertitz (4 August 1862 – 25 December 1943) was a German film actor and director. He settled in the United States. He was born in Haimhausen, Bavaria, and died in Los Angeles, California, aged 81.

Biography
Gustav von Seyffertitz was born into an aristocratic family as the son of Guido Freiherr von Seyffertitz and his wife Anna Gräfin von Butler Clonebough zu Haimhausen. His family expected him to start a military career, but was shocked when he said that he wanted to be an actor. He was a member of the Meiningen Court Theatre and also appeared in operas. He emigrated to the United States in 1896, after being asked by the Austrian-American theatre director Heinrich Conried. Despite his thick German accent, he was successful on Broadway where he worked as a stage actor and director during the 1900s and 1910s. He appeared as an actor in such lavish productions as The Brass Bottle in 1910. This play was turned into several films and was the idea for the television show I Dream of Jeannie in the 1960s. He made his film debut in 1917, appearing with Douglas Fairbanks in Down to Earth.

In his films, the dignified-looking Seyffertitz often played the "very embodiment of the Hideous Hun - America's notion of the merciless, atrocity-happy German military officer". One of his most successful film roles was Professor Moriarty in 1922's  Sherlock Holmes with John Barrymore. He also played the antagonist to Mary Pickford in Sparrows (1926) and appeared as Ramon Novarro's uncle, the king of a small German state, in Ernst Lubitsch's The Student Prince in Old Heidelberg (1927). He continued his career into the sound film and portrayed supporting roles in the Josef von Sternberg-Marlene Dietrich films Dishonored (1931) and Shanghai Express (1932). Among his later film roles was a parody on Sigmund Freud in Frank Capra's film classic Mr. Deeds Goes to Town (1936). He appeared in 118 films between 1917 and 1939.

Seyffertitz was married five times and had numerous children.

Filmography

As actor

 Down to Earth (1917) as Dr. Jollyem
 The Countess Charming (1917) as Jacob Vandergraft
 The Little Princess (1917) as Mr. Carrisford
 The Devil-Stone (1917) as Stephen Densmore
 Stella Maris (1918) as The Surgeon (uncredited)
 Rimrock Jones (1918) as Stoddard
 The Widow's Might (1918) as Horace Hammer
 The Hidden Pearls (1918) as Senator Joseph Benton
 Amarilly of Clothes-Line Alley (1918) as Surgeon (uncredited)
 The Whispering Chorus (1918) as Mocking face
 His Majesty, Bunker Bean (1918) as Professor Balthasar
 Mr. Fix-It (1918) as Doctor (uncredited)
 Old Wives for New (1918) as Melville Bladen
 To Hell with the Kaiser! (1918)
 Less Than Kin (1918) as Endicott Lee
 Till I Come Back to You (1918) as Karl von Drutz
 The Source (1918) as Ekstrom
 Sic 'Em, Sam (1918, Short)
 Swat the Kaiser (1918, Short) as The Kaiser
 The Roaring Road (1919) as Minor Role (uncredited)
 The Dark Star (1919) as German Spy
 The Vengeance of Durand (1919) as Henri Durand
 Even as Eve (1920) as Amasu Munn
 Slaves of Pride (1920) as John Reynolds
 The Sporting Duchess (1920) as Major Roland Mostyn
 Madonnas and Men (1920) as Grimaldo / John Grimm
 Dead Men Tell No Tales (1920) as Señor Joaquin
 Sherlock Holmes (1922) as Professor Moriarty
 When Knighthood Was in Flower (1922) as Grammont
 The Face in the Fog (1922) as Michael
 The Inner Man (1922) as Jud Benson
 Mark of the Beast (1923) as John Hunter
 Unseeing Eyes (1923) as Father Paquette
 Under the Red Robe (1923) as Clom
 Yolanda (1924) as Oliver de Daim
 The Lone Wolf (1924) as Wetheimer
 The Bandolero (1924) as Marques de Bazan
 The Hooded Falcon (1924)
 Grounds for Divorce (1925) as Labell
 The Goose Woman (1925) as Mr. Vogel
 A Regular Fellow (1925) as Prime Minister
 Flower of Night (1925) as Vigilante leader
 The Eagle (1925) as Court Servant at Dinner (uncredited)
 The Danger Girl (1926) as James
 Red Dice (1926) as Andrew North
 Sparrows (1926) as Mr. Grimes
 The Dice Woman (1926) as Datto of Mandat
 The Bells (1926) as Jerome Frantz
 Don Juan (1926) as Neri the alchemist (uncredited)
 The Lone Wolf Returns (1926) as Morphew
 Unknown Treasures (1926) as Simmons
 Diplomacy (1926) as Baron Ballin
 My Official Wife (1926) as Grand Duke
 Private Izzy Murphy (1926) as Cohannigan
 Going Crooked (1926) as Mordaunt
 Anything Once! (1927, Short) as Chancellor Gherkin
 The Price of Honor (1927) as Peter Fielding
 Birds of Prey (1927) as Foxy
 Barbed Wire (1927) as Pierre Corlet
 The Magic Flame (1927) as The Chancellor
 The Student Prince in Old Heidelberg (1927) as King Karl VII
 Rose of the Golden West (1927) as Gomez
 The Gaucho (1927) as Ruiz the usurper
 The Wizard (1927) as Prof. Paul Coriolos
 The Little Shepherd of Kingdom Come (1928) as Nathan Cherry
 Vamping Venus (1928) as Jupiter
 Yellow Lily (1928) as Kinkelin
 The Mysterious Lady (1928) as General Boris Alexandroff
 The Red Mark (1928) as De Nou
 The Docks of New York (1928) as "Hymn Book" Harry
 The Woman Disputed (1928) as Otto Krueger
 Me, Gangster (1928) as Factory Owner
 The Case of Lena Smith (1929) as Herr Hofrat
 The Canary Murder Case (1929) as Dr. Ambrose Lindquist
 Come Across (1929) as Pop Hanson
 Chasing Through Europe (1929) as Phineas Merrill
 His Glorious Night (1929) as Krehl
 Seven Faces (1929) as M. Pratouchy
 Dangerous Paradise (1930) as Mr. Jones
 The Case of Sergeant Grischa (1930) as General Schieffenzahn
 The Bat Whispers (1930) as Dr Venrees
 Are You There? (1930) as Barber
 Dishonored (1931) as Austrian Secret Service Chief
 The Front Page (1931) as Professor Max J. Engelhoffer (uncredited)
 Ambassador Bill (1931) as Prince de Polikoff
 Safe in Hell (1931) as Larson
 Shanghai Express (1932) as Eric Baum
 The Roadhouse Murder (1932) as Charles Spengler
 Doomed Battalion (1932) as Austrian General
 Almost Married (1932) as Pringle's Doctor
 Afraid to Talk (1932) as Attorney Harry Berger
 The Penguin Pool Murder (1932) as Von Donnen / Dr Max Bloom
 Rasputin and the Empress (1932) as Dr. Franz Wolfe (uncredited)
 The Silver Cord (1932) as German Doctor (uncredited)
 When Strangers Marry (1933) as Van Wyck
 Captured! (1933) as German Military Judge (uncredited)
 Queen Christina (1933) as General
 Mystery Liner (1934) as Inspector Von Kessling
 All Men Are Enemies (1934) as Baron (uncredited)
 Change of Heart (1934) as Dr. Nathan Kurtzman
 Murder on the Blackboard (1934) as Dr. Max Von Immen
 The Moonstone (1934) as Carl von Lucker
 Little Men (1934) as Schoolmaster Page (uncredited)
 The Night Is Young (1935) as Ambassador (uncredited)
 She (1935) as Billali (uncredited)
 Remember Last Night? (1935) as Professor Karl Jones
 Mr. Deeds Goes to Town (1936) as Doctor Emile von Haller (uncredited)
 Murder on a Bridle Path (1936) as Doctor Bloom
 Mad Holiday (1936) as Hendrick Van Mier
 In Old Chicago (1938) as Dutch
 Paradise for Three (1938) as Lawyer (uncredited)
 Swiss Miss (1938) as Gardener (uncredited)
 Marie Antoinette (1938) as King's Confessor (uncredited)
 King of Alcatraz (1938) as Bill Lustig (uncredited)
 Cipher Bureau (1938) as Albert Grood
 Son of Frankenstein (1939) as A burgher #1
 Hotel Imperial (1939) as Priest (uncredited)
 Never Say Die (1939) as Chemist (uncredited)
 Nurse Edith Cavell (1939) as President of Court
 The Mad Empress (1939) as Ambassador Metternich

As director
 The Secret Garden (1919)
 Princess Jones (1921)
 Closed Doors (1921)
 Peggy Puts It Over (1921)

References

External links

 
 
 

1862 births
1943 deaths
German male film actors
German male silent film actors
Film directors from Bavaria
German emigrants to the United States
20th-century German male actors
Burials at Forest Lawn Memorial Park (Glendale)